Matthew Marcorelle (born July 26, 1987) is a former American football defensive end. He was signed by the Houston Texans as an undrafted free agent in 2011. He played college football at University of Delaware.

References

External links
Arena Football League bio

1987 births
Living people
American football defensive ends
Delaware Fightin' Blue Hens football players
Georgia Force players
Jacksonville Sharks players
Orlando Predators players